Sesamol is a natural organic compound which is a component of sesame seeds and sesame oil, with anti-inflammatory, antioxidant, antidepressant and neuroprotective properties. It is a white crystalline solid that is a derivative of phenol.  It is sparingly soluble in water, but miscible with most oils. It can be produced by organic synthesis from heliotropine.

Sesamol has been found to be an antioxidant that may prevent the spoilage of oils.  It also may prevent the spoilage of oils by acting as an antifungal. It can be used in the synthesis of paroxetine.

Sesamol's molecular targets and mechanism of action, at least for its antidepressant-like effects, is found to be through the brain nerve growth factor (NGF) and endocannabinoid signalling under the regulatory drive of the CB1 receptors. 

Alexander Shulgin used sesamol in his book PiHKAL to make MMDA-2.

See also 
 Sesamin and sesamolin, two lignans found in sesame oil

References 

Natural phenols
Phenol antioxidants
Benzodioxoles
Sesame